Sundress EP is an EP from the American rock musician Ben Kweller. It was released August 29, 2006.

Track listing
 "Sundress"
 "Never Let You Fall"
 "Magic"
 "Sorry Signs on Cash Machines" (Mason Jennings Cover)
 "Sundress (Acoustic)"

Ben Kweller albums
2006 EPs